Emilio González Márquez assumed office as Governor of the State of Jalisco on 1 March 2007, and his term ended on 28 February 2013. The governor has the authority to nominate members of his Cabinet of the State of Jalisco, as per the Ley Orgánica del Poder Ejecutivo del Estado de Jalisco, Article 4, Section V.

Cabinet

Cabinet officials on 1 March 2007

References 

State governments of Mexico
Cabinets established in 2007
Cabinets disestablished in 2013